The second USS Experiment was a schooner in the United States Navy during the 1830s and 1840s.

Experiment was built in 1831 by the Washington Navy Yard; and sailed for tests in Chesapeake Bay in April 1832, Lieutenant William Mervine in command.

Until the middle of 1833, Experiment cruised the Atlantic coast between Boston, Massachusetts, and Charleston, South Carolina. After repairs at Norfolk, she sailed for the West Indies, returning to New York in June 1835. During the remaining three years of her cruising service, she was often used for surveying. From 1839 to 1848, when she was sold, she was in commission as a receiving ship at Philadelphia.

References
 

Schooners of the United States Navy
Ships built in the District of Columbia
1832 ships